Nick Stöpler (born 12 November 1990) is a Dutch former professional road and track cyclist.

Major results
2006
 1st  Madison, National Junior Championships (with Michael Vingerling)
2007
 1st  Madison, National Junior Championships (with Michael Vingerling)
2009
 1st  Madison, National Championships (with Michael Vingerling)
2011
 1st  Points race, National Championships
 1st Six Days of Tilburg (with Yoeri Havik)
 UEC European Under-23 Track Championships (with Yoeri Havik)
2nd  Points race
3rd  Madison
 3rd Six Days of Amsterdam (with Yoeri Havik)
2016
 1st  Madison, National Championships (with Melvin van Zijl)

References

External links

1990 births
Living people
Dutch male cyclists
Dutch track cyclists
Sportspeople from Arnhem
Cyclists from Gelderland
21st-century Dutch people